Stepan Voitko (22 February 1947) is a former professional Soviet football defender and later Soviet and Ukrainian coach.

References

External links
 
 Hadzheha, V. Stepan Voitko: "For my work football appreciated me hundredfold (Степан Войтко: "За мої труди футбол віддячив мені сторицею"). Lobda. 15 December 2017

1947 births
Living people
Sportspeople from Uzhhorod
Soviet footballers
Ukrainian footballers
FC Hoverla Uzhhorod players
FC Iskra Smolensk players
Soviet football managers
Ukrainian football managers
Ukrainian expatriate football managers
Expatriate football managers in Hungary
Ukrainian expatriate sportspeople in Hungary
FC Hoverla Uzhhorod managers
FC Karpaty Mukacheve managers
Association football defenders